No. 672 Squadron RAF was a glider squadron of the Royal Air Force active during the Second World War.

History
No. 672 Squadron was formed at Bikram, Patna in India on 16 November 1944 as a glider squadron, with the intention of being used for airborne operations by South East Asia Command. It continued to train, as part of No. 344 Wing RAF, until the surrender of Japan, when it became surplus to requirements. The squadron was disbanded as last unit of 344 Wing at Chaklala on 1 July 1946.

Present
The squadron today is represented by 672 Squadron of 9 Regiment, Army Air Corps.

Aircraft operated
1945          || 1945        || Auster

Squadron bases

References

Notes

Bibliography

External links
 History of No.'s 671–1435 Squadrons at RAF Web

672 Squadron